Mary Artemisia Lathbury (August 10, 1841 - October 20, 1913) was an American poet and hymnwriter.

Early life
Lathbury was born on August 10, 1841 in Manchester, New York. Her father, along with her two brothers, were Methodist ministers. As a child, she enjoyed reading, writing, and illustrating poems that she wrote herself. She was originally an artist and also taught art in Vermont and New York schools, but later transitioned more towards religious work and writing. She was the general editor of materials for the Methodist Sunday School. Lathbury said that she became involved with Christian service full-time because God said to her, "Remember, my child, that you have a gift of weaving fancies into verse and a gift with the pencil of producing visions that come to your heart; consecrate these to Me as thoroughly as you do your inmost spirit".

Career
Lathbury has contributed to St. Nicholas, Harper's Young People, and Wide Awake. Her books include Fleda and the Voice, Out of Darkness Into Light, Seven Little Maids, among others. Her hymns include Day  is Dying in the West and Break Thou the Bread of Life. She was known as the "Poet Laureate and Saint of Chautauqua".

Death
Lathbury died on October 20, 1913 in East Orange, New Jersey, and was buried at Rosedale Cemetery in the same city.

References

1841 births
1913 deaths
American Christian hymnwriters
American women poets
American women hymnwriters
19th-century American women musicians